Menemerus animatus is a jumping spider first described by Octavius Pickard-Cambridge in Egypt. It is found in an area that includes the Mediterranean Sea and the northern part of Afrotropical realm. It is related to Menemerus davidi, Menemerus guttatus, Menemerus modestus and Menemerus silver.

References

Salticidae
Spiders of Africa
Spiders of Asia
Spiders described in 1876